The M. protractor pterygoidei et quadrati is a cranial muscle that pulls the streptostylic quadrate dorsorostrally in birds.

Bird anatomy

Muscles of the head and neck